is a former Japanese professional  baseball player. He played for the Tokyo Yakult Swallows of the Nippon Professional Baseball(NPB).

On September 17, 2019, Miwa announced his retirement.

References

External links

 NPB.com

1984 births
Living people
Japanese baseball players
Nippon Professional Baseball infielders
People from Shimonoseki
Tokyo Yakult Swallows players